Gary Putland (born 10 February 1986 in Bedford Park, South Australia) is an Australian professional cricketer. He is a left-arm fast-medium bowler for the Southern Redbacks, the representative team of the South Australian Cricket Association.

Putland represented Australia at youth level and was trained at the Australian Cricket Academy. He played grade cricket for Southern Districts. He started playing limited overs and Twenty20 matches for South Australia in the 2005–06 season, but it took him until February 2010 to make his first-class debut for the state, in a Sheffield Shield match against Western Australia. He entered the players auction to join the Indian Premier League in 2011, but was unsold.

References

Australian cricketers
South Australia cricketers
1986 births
Living people
Adelaide Strikers cricketers
Cricketers from Adelaide